Beaugendre is a French surname. Notable people with the surname include:

François Beaugendre (1880–1936), French cyclist
Joël Beaugendre (born 1950), Guadeloupean politician
Madely Beaugendre (born 1965), French high jumper
Omer Beaugendre (1883–1954), French cyclist

French-language surnames